Triparma is a genus of unicellular algae in the family Triparmaceae in the order Parmales. They form siliceous plates on the cell surface that aid in identification. Triparma is distinguished by its possession of three shield plates, three triradiate girdle plates, a triradiate girdle plate with notched ends, and a small ventral plate. It was first described by Booth & Marchant in 1987 and the holotype is Triparma columacea.

Triparma cells have two forms: the motile, naked form and the non-motile siliceous form. The motile cells propelled by two flagella of unequal length, typical of heterokonts. The non-motile forms do not possess flagella but instead have a silicified cell wall with a distinctive plate morphology: three shield plates, three oblong girdle plates, a triradiate dorsal plate with rounded ends, and a large ventral plate. Both forms contain a single, dorsal chloroplast that contains chlorophylls a and c1-3 as well as fucoxanthin. They are typically 1-2 μm in size and generally spherical or heart-shaped.

The genus Triparma is actively studied because of their close relationship to the diatoms, and it has been discovered that they have different silica-limitation responses. While diatoms stop growing and cell division is inhibited under low-silica conditions, Triparma continues to grow and divide normally even under nanomolar concentrations of silica, although the silica plates are no longer produced.

Photosynthetic pigments present in bolydophyte chloroplasts include chlorophylls a, c1, c2, c3, fucoxanthin, diatoxanthin, diadinoxanthin.

Synonyms 
The genus now includes all species from the non-monophyletic genus Bolidomonas, according to Ichinomiya et al (2016).

Taxonomy 
 Class Bolidophyceae Guillou & Chretiennot-Dinet 1999
 Order Parmales Booth & Marchant 1987
 Family Triparmaceae Booth & Marchant 1988
 Genus Triparma Booth & Marchant 1987
 Species T. columacea Booth 1987
 Species T. eleuthera Ichinomiya & Lopes dos Santos 2016
 Species T. laevis Booth 1987
 Species T. mediterranea (Guillou & Chrétiennot-Dinet) Ichinomiya & Lopes dos Santos 2016
 Species T. pacifica (Guillou & Chrétiennot-Dinet) Ichinomiya & Lopes dos Santos 2016
 Species T. retinervis Booth 1987
 Species T. strigata Booth 1987
 Species T. verrucosa Booth 1987

References 

Algae genera
Heterokont genera
Ochrophyta